Sir John Jacques, 1st Baronet (died 1650) was an English politician who sat in the House of Commons  in 1640.

Jacques was the son of John Jacques and his wife Elizabeth Cowper daughter of John Cowper, alderman and sheriff of London. He was created Baronet, of the County of Middlesex, by King Charles I on 2 September 1628.

In April 1640, Jacques was elected Member of Parliament for Haslemere in the Short Parliament. 
 
Jacques married Mary but died without issue in 1650 when the baronetcy became extinct.

References

1650 deaths
English MPs 1640 (April)
Year of birth missing
Baronets in the Baronetage of England